Lars Skoglund (born March 27, 1974 in Bodø, Norway) is a Norwegian composer and musician.

Biography 
Skoglund was fascinated by pop and rock music at a young. He started playing guitar and drums in different bands. He also became interested in contemporary classical music, with a special attraction to composers like Charles Ives, Anton Webern, and Pierre Boulez. After finishing studies of musicology and philosophy at the Norwegian University of Science and Technology in Trondheim, he attended the Rotterdam Conservatory (1999-2003). He earned a diploma in jazz, electronics, and classical composition, supervised by Klaas de Vries, Paul van Brugge, and Rene Uijlenhoet.

Skoglund work as freelance composer and was composer in residence from rom 2006 to 2008 for the Department of Art Studies at the Tromsø University College in Northern-Norway. He has composed music for various ensembles, including for the Domestica Ensemble, and for various dance performances.

Honors 
 2004: NOG Jonge Composistenprijs for Sentences during the Project Young Composers of Holland Symfonia

References

External links 
 
 Lars Skoglund - Composer at MIC.no

21st-century Norwegian composers
Norwegian jazz guitarists
Norwegian jazz drummers
Male drummers
Norwegian male guitarists
Norwegian contemporary classical composers
Musicians from Bodø
1974 births
Living people
21st-century Norwegian guitarists
21st-century Norwegian drummers
21st-century Norwegian male musicians
Male jazz musicians